Rush was a Canadian progressive rock band originally formed in August 1968, in the Willowdale neighbourhood of Toronto, Ontario. For the overwhelming majority of its existence, the band consisted of bassist, keyboardist, and lead vocalist Geddy Lee, guitarist Alex Lifeson, and drummer and lyricist Neil Peart. The band achieved this definitive form when Neil Peart replaced original drummer, John Rutsey, in July 1974.

The band released its eponymous debut album in March 1974. Since then, they have achieved 24 gold records and 14 platinum (3 multi-platinum) records. According to the RIAA, Rush's sales statistics also place them third behind the Beatles and the Rolling Stones for the most consecutive gold or platinum albums by a rock band. As of 2022, Rush ranks 84th in US album sales with 26 million units and industry sources estimate their total worldwide album sales at over 40 million. 

One of Rush's more recent releases is the Signals: 40th Anniversary box set, to be released on April 28, 2023. The Signals box set was preceded by similar 40th Anniversary releases of 2112 on December 16, 2016, A Farewell to Kings on December 1, 2017, Hemispheres on November 16, 2018, Permanent Waves on May 29, 2020, and Moving Pictures on April 15, 2022.

Albums

Studio albums

Live albums

Compilation albums

Videos

Video albums

Music videos

Extended plays and singles

EP

Retail singles

Notes:

Sources: Discogs

Promotional singles and other charted songs

Box sets

See also
List of Rush songs

References

External links
Power Windows: A Tribute to Rush
Cygnus-X1.Net: A Tribute to Rush

Discographies of Canadian artists
Discography
Rock music group discographies